Apoxyptilus is a genus of moths in the family Pterophoridae containing only three species:
Apoxyptilus anthites (Meyrick, 1936), which is known from Kenya, South Africa, Tanzania and Uganda
Apoxyptilus steineri  Gielis, 2011 (from Madagascar)
Apoxyptilus uzumarus  Kovtunovich & Ustjuzhanin, 2014 (from Malawi)

Etymology
The generic name indicates that this genus not closely related to Oxyptilus.

References

De Prins, J. & De Prins, W. 2016. Afromoths, online database of Afrotropical moth species (Lepidoptera). World Wide Web electronic publication (www.afromoths.net) (acc. 01-Jan-2016)

Oxyptilini
Moths of Africa
Moth genera